Peyrelongue-Abos (Gascon: Pèiralonga e Avòs) is a commune in the Pyrénées-Atlantiques department in south-western France.

History
In 1843, Peyrelongue absorbed the neighbouring commune of Abos to form the commune of Peyrelongue-Abos.

See also
Communes of the Pyrénées-Atlantiques department

References

Communes of Pyrénées-Atlantiques